Shartegosuchus is a genus of protosuchian-grade crocodylomorph. It is known primarily from PIN 4174/2, the partial deformed skull and jaws of a juvenile. This specimen was discovered in ancient lake deposits of the Tithonian-age Upper Jurassic Tsagaantsav Formation, southwestern Mongolia. This genus was similar to Nominosuchus, and both are assigned to the same family (Shartegosuchidae). Shartegosuchus was described in 1988 by Mikhail Efimov, and the type species is S. asperopalatum.

References

Late Jurassic reptiles of Asia
Late Jurassic crocodylomorphs
Prehistoric pseudosuchian genera